Hear My Cry is the debut studio album by British singer Sonique, released on 15 February 2000. It features the singles "It Feels So Good", which reached number one in the UK Singles Chart, "I Put a Spell on You" and "Sky". The album has sold over half a million copies in the UK alone.

Track listing 

Note
 Track 14 is a bonus track on some releases.

Charts

Weekly charts

Year-end charts

Certifications and sales

References 

2000 debut albums
Sonique (musician) albums
Universal Music Group albums